The IRS, since 1992, has shadowed and recorded the top four hundred people who make the most gross income, and they are call the Fortunate 400.

Summary 
The Fortunate 400 are basically the richest people in the United States. In 1992, when the IRS starting tracking the people who make the most money, the 400th richest person in America made $24 million. Then In 2007, the 400th richest human produced $138 million (or $87 million, inflation-adjusted). These riches have come from capital gain, and the rich keep making more money. There is a constant question and debate in politics whether or not the rich need more tax cuts or need to pay more taxes.

References 

1992 establishments in the United States
Internal Revenue Service
High society (social class)
Lists of American people
Wealth in the United States